Guzki  is a village in the administrative district of Gmina Ełk, within Ełk County, Warmian-Masurian Voivodeship, in northern Poland.

Notable residents
 Kurt Christofzik (1910–1976), Wehrmacht officer

References

Villages in Ełk County